The T-12 (also known as Cloudmaker) earthquake bomb was developed by the United States from 1944 to 1948 and deployed until the withdrawal of the Convair B-36 Peacemaker bomber aircraft in 1958. It was one of a small class of bombs designed to attack targets invulnerable to conventional "soft" bombs, such as bunkers and viaducts. It achieved this by having an extremely thick, hardened nose section designed to penetrate deeply into hardened concrete structures and then detonate inside the target after a short time delay.

Development 
The T-12 was a further development of the concept initiated with the United Kingdom's Tallboy and Grand Slam weapons developed by British aeronautical engineer Barnes Wallis during the Second World War: a hardened, highly aerodynamic bomb of the greatest possible weight designed to be dropped from the highest possible altitude. Penetrating deeply in the earth before exploding, the resulting shock wave was transmitted through the earth into targets. The resulting underground cavity and ground motion could also undermine structures. The bomb could also be used against hardened targets. These types of bombs can reach supersonic speeds and have tail fins designed to spin the bomb for greater accuracy.

This was twice the size of the United States' previous largest bomb, the  M110 (T-14), the American-built version of the British Grand Slam. The T-12 was not a simple scale up of the M110, but incorporated modifications based on testing and calculations. The B-36 was redesigned so it could carry the T-12, although a converted B-29 Superfortress was used for testing.

See also
 Aviation Thermobaric Bomb of Increased Power
 BLU-82
 Bunker buster
 Grand Slam bomb
 Massive Ordnance Penetrator
 MOAB

References

External links

 "Big Bomb Tight Fit In B-29 Bomb Bays",  Popular Science, October 1951, p. 144. Photo showing T-12 being fitted to B-29 bomb bay
 "The USA's 30,000 Pound Bomb", Defense Industry Daily.  Article on the new Massive Ordnance Penetrator (MOP), has history of earlier systems.
 "The Extra-Super Blockbuster"  by Dr. William S. Coker. Air University Review, March-April 1967.

Anti-fortification weapons
Cold War aerial bombs of the United States